The Suranadi Nature Recreation Park is located near Nusa Tenggara Barat in Indonesia. It was established in 1976. This site is 0.52 km2 and is known for hiking.

References

Protected areas of Indonesia
Protected areas established in 1976